Uzbekistan competed at the 2004 Summer Olympics in Athens, Greece, from 13 to 29 August 2004. This was the nation's third consecutive appearance at the Olympics. The National Olympic Committee of the Republic of Uzbekistan sent a total of 70 athletes to the Games, 52 men and 18 women, to compete in 13 different sports, tying its delegation record with Sydney four years earlier. There was only a single competitor in road cycling, artistic and trampoline gymnastics, and table tennis.

Seventeen athletes from the Uzbek team had previously competed in Sydney, including artistic gymnast and three-time Olympic medalist Oksana Chusovitina (who transferred to Germany in 2002 to treat her ailing son Alisher from leukemia), freestyle wrestler Artur Taymazov, who won silver in men's super heavyweight, sprint freestyle swimmer and Asian Games champion Ravil Nachaev, trampoline gymnast Ekaterina Khilko, and heavyweight judoka Abdullo Tangriev, who later became the nation's flag bearer in the opening ceremony. At age 15, backstroke swimmer Olga Gnedovskaya set a historical milestone for Uzbekistan as the youngest ever athlete in history to compete at the Olympics. Other notable Uzbek athletes featured road cyclist and world junior champion Sergey Lagutin, canoeist Anton Ryahov, who later competed for the Russian at his subsequent Olympics, and swimming siblings Danil Bugakov and Mariya Bugakova.

Uzbekistan left Athens with a total of five medals, two golds, one silver, and two bronze, being considered its most successful Olympics in history since the post-Soviet era. Three of these medals were awarded to the athletes in wrestling, including a prestigious gold from Taymazov in men's super heavyweight freestyle. Meanwhile, boxers Bahodirjon Sultonov and Utkirbek Haydarov managed to claim bronze medals in their respective weight classes.

Medalists

Athletics

Uzbek athletes have so far achieved qualifying standards in the following athletics events (up to a maximum of 3 athletes in each event at the 'A' Standard, and 1 at the 'B' Standard). Shot putter Olga Shchukina was disqualified from the competition after being tested positive for clenbuterol.

Men
Track & road events

Field events

Combined events – Decathlon

Women
Track & road events

Field events

Boxing

Uzbekistan sent nine boxers to Athens.  All nine made it past the round of 32, with five victories and four byes.  Four of the boxers fell in the round of 16 (two of which had not had matches in the round of 32).  Three more barely missed medalling by being defeated in the quarterfinals, while the two that had won their quarterfinal bouts both lost in the semifinals to earn bronze medals.

Canoeing

Sprint
Men

Women

Qualification Legend: Q = Qualify to final; q = Qualify to semifinal

Cycling

Road

Gymnastics

Artistic
Women

Trampoline

Judo

Six Uzbek judoka qualified for the 2004 Summer Olympics.

Men

Rowing

Uzbek rowers qualified the following boats:

Men

Women

Qualification Legend: FA=Final A (medal); FB=Final B (non-medal); FC=Final C (non-medal); FD=Final D (non-medal); FE=Final E (non-medal); FF=Final F (non-medal); SA/B=Semifinals A/B; SC/D=Semifinals C/D; SE/F=Semifinals E/F; R=Repechage

Shooting 

Two Uzbek shooters (one man and one woman) qualified to compete in the following events:

Men

Women

Swimming

Uzbek swimmers earned qualifying standards in the following events (up to a maximum of 2 swimmers in each event at the A-standard time, and 1 at the B-standard time):

Men

Women

Table tennis

Uzbekistan has qualified a single table tennis player.

Taekwondo

Two Uzbek taekwondo jin qualified for the following events.

Weightlifting

Three Uzbek weightlifters qualified for the following events:

Wrestling 

Men's freestyle

Men's Greco-Roman

See also
 Uzbekistan at the 2002 Asian Games
 Uzbekistan at the 2004 Summer Paralympics

References

External links
Official Report of the XXVIII Olympiad
Uzbekistan National Olympic Committee 

Nations at the 2004 Summer Olympics
2004
Olympics